The MIAC men's basketball tournament is the annual conference basketball championship tournament for the NCAA Division III Minnesota Intercollegiate Athletic Conference. It is a single-elimination tournament and seeding is based on regular season records.

The winner, declared conference champion, receives the MIAC's automatic bid to the NCAA Men's Division III Basketball Championship.

Results
 Record incomplete prior to 2001

Championship records
Results are incomplete before 2001. Schools that are no longer MIAC members, as of the next college basketball season in 2021–22, are highlighted in pink.

 Concordia Moorhead, Hamline, Saint Mary's, and St. Scholastica have not yet qualified for the tournament finals.
 Teams highlighted in pink are former MIAC members

References

NCAA Division III men's basketball conference tournaments
Basketball Tournament, Men's